The Trans Europ Express, or Trans-Europe Express (TEE), was an international first-class railway service in western and central Europe that was founded in 1957 and ceased in 1995. At the height of its operations, in 1974, the TEE network comprised 45 trains, connecting 130 different cities, from Spain in the west to Austria in the east, and from Denmark to Southern Italy.

Origin
The first services commenced on 2 June 1957 following an idea of F.Q. den Hollander, then president-director of the Dutch national railway company (NS). TEE was a network jointly operated by the railways of West Germany (DB), France (SNCF), Switzerland (SBB-CFF-FFS), Italy (FS) and the Netherlands. Although some trains passed through Belgium from the beginning, the Belgian national railway company (NMBS/SNCB) joined the program only in 1964. Luxembourg (CFL) also joined at a later date.

The idea was for a network of fast and comfortable transnational trains that would be attractive to businessmen and other regular travellers. All trains were first-class-only and required payment of a special supplement over the normal first-class ticket price, the amount of which depended on the distance covered. Where possible, TEE trains' schedules were timed to allow a business traveller to make a round trip (return journey) within a single day and also have time for business activity at the destination. Each train was named, and all were expresses, stopping only at major cities. Some of the named trains had already existed for some years before creation of the TEE network and were simply newly designated as Trans-Europe Expresses in 1957 or later. For example, the Settebello had been in operation since 1953 and the Rheingold since 1951 (as a revival of a pre-World War II train). The network was launched in 1957 with trains serving 13 different routes.

Rolling stock

Initially, the system was a completely diesel network. Because of the many different kinds of electrical specifications (voltages and current types – alternating current and direct current) used in the different countries it was thought at that time that use of diesel-hauled trains or diesel multiple-unit trainsets would greatly speed up border crossing. Moreover, at that time many border crossing sections were not yet electrified. The German DB built the streamlined DB Class VT 11.5, while the Swiss Federal Railways (SBB) and the Dutch NS developed the RAm / DE, both diesel trains.

However, the creation of the international TEE network provided impetus for the development of special electric trainsets and electric locomotives, capable of operating at two or more different voltages. The DB used the 160 km/h E 10.12 and the 200 km/h DB Class 103, among other types. The SBB developed its RAe TEE II electric trainset, which was designed for four different railway electrification systems, and this type entered service in 1961. Belgian National Railways introduced its Type 150 locomotives (now called Class 15) in 1962, capable of handling three different voltages, followed by the four-voltage Type 160 (Class 16) in 1966 and Class 18 in 1973. Meanwhile, France's SNCF also developed and introduced ten quadruple-voltage locomotives, its Class CC 40100, between 1964 and 1970.

By 1975, all but two (L'Arbalète and Bavaria) of the 43 TEE trains were electrically powered, and most were locomotive-hauled.

Modification of service
Originally the idea was to promote only international routes as TEE routes. This idea was abandoned in 1965 with the introduction of the French Le Mistral and the German Blauer Enzian. Later, TEE trains serving single countries were also introduced on other routes in France and Germany as well as in Italy, but most TEE routes continued to be international.

Growth

The network grew in the course of the years, adding three more countries: Spain (Renfe), Denmark (DSB) and Austria (ÖBB). The system reached furthest in 1974. However, of these three only Renfe became a TEE member; the other two countries had TEEs running through them but the rail administrations were never members. In the late 1970s, the TEE network comprised 39 different named trains, serving 31 routes. A few routes had more than one TEE train concurrently; for example, the Paris–Brussels route had four TEEs, running at different times of the day.

Contraction and end

From the late 1970s onward, gradually more and more Trans-Europe Express trains were replaced by other trains giving a similar kind of service but also carrying 2nd class.  Business travellers used air travel more and more. In 1979 DB completely restructured the network with the coming of the new national InterCity services, resulting in successively fewer TEE services and more InterCity services in the course of time. The introduction of the TGV service in France in 1981, and its subsequent expansion, along with expansion of high-speed rail lines in other European countries led to still more TEEs' being replaced by domestic high-speed trains.

After 1984 most services were abandoned, leaving only some national services in (mostly) Italy and France and very few international services. Most trains were replaced by a new international intercity network with the name EuroCity which provides both 1st and 2nd class service. The EuroCity network began operating on 31 May 1987, and with effect from that date the last remaining international Trans-Europe Express trains were redesignated or withdrawn, except the Gottardo  (reclassified as EuroCity in September 1988), but in name, the TEE designation continued to be used for a few domestic trains operating entirely within France until 1 June 1991.

In September 1993 certain former TEE trains operating non-stop journeys between Brussels and Paris (or vice versa), which had been converted to EuroCity and offered both first- and second-class coaches, were rebranded as Trans-Europe Expresses, but remaining two-class trains. This was during a transition of Paris–Brussels express services to a new TGV alignment, and initially included the trains Brabant, Île de France, Rubens and Watteau, all four serving the route in both directions. However, by 1995 the only TEE-branded trains remaining were the northbound Île de France (train 85) and southbound Watteau (train 88), the opposing-direction trains carrying the same names having already been converted to TGV stock (and designation), and these last two TEEs were replaced by TGV trains with effect from 29 May 1995, once again ending the formal use of the Trans-Europ Express name. These few Paris–Brussels (or vice versa) expresses, operated 1993–1995, were the only TEE-designated trains ever to carry second-class carriages (they were in effect EuroCity services). A few trains continued to utilise TEE branded coaches until 1 June 1996, but the trains themselves were no longer classified as TEEs.

Proposed new TEE network (2020s)
In September 2020, Germany made proposals for a new Trans Europe Express TEE 2.0 network. Proposed routes in the short term include:
Amsterdam – Paris – Barcelona
Brussels – Berlin – Warsaw
Amsterdam – Frankfurt – Zürich – Rome
Barcelona – Frankfurt – Berlin
Proposed daytime high-speed TEE 2.0 routes following the completion of new lines include:
Stockholm – Hamburg – Paris
Stockholm – Berlin – Munich
Rome – Verona – Munich – Berlin
Paris – Munich – Budapest

There are also proposals for night train networks proposed in the short-term which are remarkably similar to Deutsche Bahn's former City Night Line network, which DB discontinued in 2016. Most of the routes in the short-term network are currently operated by Austrian Federal Railways (ÖBB) as part of its Nightjet network although a proposed Frankfurt – Lyon – Barcelona service would offer a direct rail services that has not been possible for many decades. Overnight routes proposed in the longer term include two routes from Stockholm, one serving both Amsterdam and Paris, the other running via Prague to Vienna and Budapest.

In May 2021, TRANSPORT ministers from multiple European Union (EU) member states have signed a letter of intent to create the Trans-Europe Express (TEE) 2.0 network first announced in September 2020 during the German presidency of the EU. The Agreement includes the development of a regular interval timetable. Member states will also identify operators interested in taking part.

The signing took place during a conference organised by German federal transport minister, Mr Andreas Scheuer, on 17 May, and includes a number of pledges which expand the initial TEE 2.0 concept.

The agreement foresees the development of a regular interval timetable on a pan-European basis to provide an alternative to short-haul flights and car journeys. The original German proposal for the TEE 2.0 concept assumes:

TEE 2.0 services connect at least three EU member states or two member states over at least 600 km
TEE 2.0 trains operate at a minimum of 160 km/h on a substantial part of the route or an average speed of more than 100 km/h on the entire route, and
TEE 2.0 offers increased comfort, with free Wi-Fi and restaurant cars.

While the letter of intent is not legally binding, the signatories agree to identify which railway operators from their respective countries want to be involved in delivering future TEE 2.0 services. They also pledged to act as facilitators to ensure that rail operators and infrastructure managers in neighbouring countries make meaningful progress in developing TEE 2.0 plans.

In addition, the signatories agreed to request that the European Commission (EC) propose the launch of an EU financial assistance programme to invest in rolling stock that can operate across borders. They also agreed to lobby for further technical and operational improvements to facilitate the operation of cross-border rail services.

Under the new agreement, and to support the prospective operators, the EU member states promise to act as moderators in the development of timetables. They also vow to support the creation of an interoperable digital booking platform which supports booking international journeys offered by TEE 2.0 operators, which should be as straightforward as domestic journeys. How such a system would deal with the domestic parts of journeys to or from the high-speed rail network, and how third-party rail ticket sales websites might be included, is unclear.

A proposed network published after the conference has been expanded compared with the earlier iteration, which was centred on central Europe. It now includes routes that can be achieved relatively simply such as Barcelona – Nice – Venice as well as others such as Warsaw – Riga – Tallinn that rely on major new infrastructure projects now underway, in this case Rail Baltica, which is due to open in 2026.

Some existing high frequency international links have also been included at the request of EU member states, including Amsterdam – London route serving non-EU member, Britain.

Separately, as part of the conference, Germany, the Czech Republic and Austria signed a Memorandum of Understanding for the future expansion of the Berlin – Dresden – Prague – Vienna Via Vindobona international connection. The declaration outlines the planned high-speed line and other infrastructure plans for the route.

Cultural references
The railway service was the subject of a 1977 album by German electronic music group Kraftwerk, the music of which has been sampled multiple times and has thus engrained the railway reference in a variety of musical genres. One of the locations from the 1992 video game Earnest Evans is based on a train using the Trans Europ Express.

List of the TEE trains

Notes

See also

 Lufthansa Airport Express – a non-TEE service whose trains were designated by "TEE" numbers by their operator, Deutsche Bundesbahn
 Train categories in Europe
Ontario Northland Railway, operator 4 RAm/DE train sets from 1977 to 1980s; most scrapped with 1 set in the Netherlands and 2 cars stored in North Bay, Ontario

References

Notes

Bibliography

External links

TEE Classics – Swiss based society for the preservation of TEE motive power and rolling stock 
rail.lu:The TEE in Luxembourg – images of TEE trains in Luxembourg
 

 
Train-related introductions in 1957
1957 establishments in Europe